The Griffon Aerospace MQM-170 Outlaw is an unmanned aerial vehicle which is used to support air defense artillery training, research, development, and test activities. It can serve as a target drone, surrogate training platform, or in a surrogate aerial reconnaissance and forward observation role. The aircraft has been in use since 2004.

The system consists of an air vehicle and a ground control station which includes an optional satellite link communication suite. The Outlaw may be launched pneumatically, or by runway takeoff when equipped with landing gear.

References

External links
 Griffon Aerospace MQM-170 Outlaw page on Designation Systems.net
 U.S. Army PEO STRI Outlaw Remotely Piloted Vehicle Target 
Aviation Week Article Griffon
Huntsville Times Article
local news articles Griffon

MQM-170
2000s United States special-purpose aircraft
Target drones of the United States
Single-engined pusher aircraft
Low-wing aircraft
V-tail aircraft